Ostermundigen railway station is a railway station in the municipality of Ostermundigen, in the Swiss canton of Bern. It is an intermediate stop on the standard gauge Bern–Lucerne and Bern–Thun lines of Swiss Federal Railways.

Services 
The following services stop at Ostermundigen:

 Bern S-Bahn:

References

External links 
 
 

Railway stations in the canton of Bern
Swiss Federal Railways stations